The first permanent congregation of The Church of Jesus Christ of Latter-day Saints in Spain was established in 1948. As of 2021, the Church reported 61,455 members in 137 congregations in Spain, making it the second largest body of Church members in Europe behind the United Kingdom. In 2019, Spain had the 3rd most Church members per capita among countries in Europe, behind Portugal and the United Kingdom.

History

No formal missionary work was performed in Spain until after the Church was officially recognized in 1968 by the Spanish government. The first branch (small congregation) other than among US Military staff stationed in Spain, was organized in 1968 in Madrid. In 1982, the Madrid and Barcelona Stakes (larger congregations) were organized.  The Spain Missionary Training Center (MTC), located in the Madrid Temple complex, was established in 1999.

Stakes and District

As of February 2023, the LDS Church has 15 Stakes and 1 District in Spain:

Missions

Temples
The Madrid Temple was dedicated in 1999.  The temple complex includes the Madrid Spain Temple, the Spain Missionary Training Center, an institute, temple patron housing, a distribution center, a Family History Center, and underground parking.

See also

Religion in Spain

References

External links
Church Newsroom - Spain
The Church of Jesus Christ of Latter-day Saints (Spain) - Official Site
 ComeUntoChrist.org Latter-day Saints Visitor site

 
1968 establishments in Spain
1968 in Christianity